The 2002 Bahraini Crown Prince Cup was the 2nd edition of the cup tournament in men's football (soccer). This edition featured the top four sides from the Bahraini Premier League 2001-02 season. The tournament was also slimmed down after featuring 8 sides in the first edition.

Bracket

Bahraini Crown Prince Cup seasons
2002 domestic association football cups
2001–02 in Bahraini football